Cleveland Heights is a city in Cuyahoga County, Ohio, United States, and one of Cleveland's historical streetcar suburbs.  The city's population was 45,312 at the 2020 census. As of the 2010 census, Cleveland Heights was ranked the 8th largest city by population in the Greater Cleveland area and ranked 20th in Ohio. It was founded as a village in 1903 and a city in 1921.

History

The area that is now Cleveland Heights was settled later than most of Cuyahoga County. The first road through what is today the city, Mayfield Road, was not built until 1828. Some of the land was divided into farms, but It also had quarries in the 19th century. One of the early quarries was established by Duncan McFarland who mined bluestone. This led to the settlement that grew up around the quarry for the workers to live in to be referred to as Bluestone. There is still a road of this name in that area.

Eventually some of the land, straddling both suburbs, was turned into residential developments and, in 1938, the family donated land which is now Forest Hill Park. There had been quarries within what is today Forest Hill Park previous to Rockefeller donating it to the city.

Rockefeller was not the only affluent Clevelander to come to what is now Cleveland Heights.  The Euclid Heights development was created by Patrick Calhoun starting in 1892.  It was centered around the Euclid Golf Course and began at the Cleveland city line, covering the area between Mayfield and Cedar roads as far east as Coventry Road.  There was a streetcar line from this location running to the center of Cleveland's business district.

In 1898 Marcus M. Brown began the development of Mayfield Heights along the south side of Mayfield Road and east of the current Coventry Road - taking advantage of the Mayfield Road streetcar.  Brown had purchased this land from Emil Preyer and his sister Mary Preyer Hellwig.  Emil was operator of a cedar mill.

By the end of 1899 the streetcar reached out along Mayfield Road to the old village of Fairmount.  In 1903 the village of Cleveland Heights was incorporated.  In 1910 Cleveland Heights had a population about 5,000 people.  It had a population of 15,396 in 1920 and was incorporated as a city on August 9, 1921. Between 1920 and 1930, Cleveland Heights' population more than tripled. By 1960 it had a population of 61,813.

In the 1950s, Cleveland Heights saw the influx of many Jewish people leaving Cleveland, particularly the Hough and Glenville neighborhoods. In 1961, 35%  of the Jewish population of Cuyahoga County lived in Cleveland Heights. Although the Black population of Cleveland Heights was less than 1% in 1960, partially due to restrictive covenants, Black Clevelanders began to move into Cleveland Heights in the 1960s and 70s. This led to violence and pushback from some white citizens. However, organizations such as Heights Citizens For Human Rights and Heights Community Congress formed in the 1960s and 70s to protest violence against Black citizens, and promote integration in the city.

Geography

Cleveland Heights is located at  (41.509652, -81.563301).

Cleveland Heights is made up of three watersheds, the Doan Brook Watershed, the Dugway Brook Watershed, and the Nine Mile Creek Watershed. Approximately 50% of Cleveland Heights is part of the Dugway Brook Watershed.

Environment

In 1987, the city of Cleveland Heights was declared a nuclear-free zone.

Parks
Cleveland Heights has seven city parks: Barbara H. Boyd Park, Cain Park, Cumberland Park, Denison Park, Forest Hill Park, Kenilworth Park and Turtle Park.

Demographics

As of the 2020 United States census, there were 45,312 people and 18,976 households residing in the city. The racial makeup of the city was 46.8% White, 39.7% Black or African American, 5.7% Asian, 3.1% from two or more races, and 2.8% Hispanic or Latino. The gender makeup of the city was 44.4% male and 55.6% female. The median income for a household in the city was $59,086. The per capita income for the city was $38,311. About 18.0% of individuals were below the poverty line.

As of the census of 2010, there were 46,238 people, 19,957 households, and 10,834 families residing in the city. The racial makeup of the city was 49.8% White, 42.5% African American, 0.2% Native American, 4.1% Asian, 0.6% from other races, and 2.8% from two or more races. Hispanic or Latino of any race were 2.0% of the population.

There were 19,957 households, of which 26.2% had children under the age of 18 living with them, 35.6% were married couples living together, 15.2% had a female householder with no husband present, 3.4% had a male householder with no wife present, and 45.7% were non-families. 36.1% of all households were made up of individuals, and 10.4% had someone living alone who was 65 years of age or older. The average household size was 2.27 and the average family size was 3.05.

The median age in the city was 35.8 years. 22.3% of residents were under the age of 18; 10.6% were between the ages of 18 and 24; 27.9% were from 25 to 44; 25.9% were from 45 to 64; and 13.5% were 65 years of age or older. The gender makeup of the city was 46.6% male and 53.4% female.

The median income for a household in the city was $53,024. The per capita income for the city was $31,663. About 19.3% of individuals were below the poverty line.

Politics and government
Cleveland Heights is governed by a city charter adopted in 1921 and amended in 1972, 1982, 1986 and 2019. 

Until 2019, the Cleveland Heights city charter specified a council–manager form of government, with seven members of council elected to four-year terms. Three councilmembers are elected one year before a presidential election, and four councilmembers were elected one year after a presidential election. All are elected using plurality at-large non-partisan voting. Councilmembers elected a President and Vice President from among its members during January following each Council election. Both the President and Vice President have additional duties including parliamentary and ceremonial responsibilities, and under the Council-manager form of government, the President of City Council held the honorary title of Mayor. The city manager for Cleveland Heights was selected by City Council and served at their pleasure.

On November 5, 2019, Cleveland Heights voters approved an amendment to the city's charter to become a strong Mayor-Council form of government with the Mayor serving as the city's chief executive. Under the amended Charter, in November 2021, Cleveland Heights voters cast ballots for Mayor for the first time. Kahlil Seren was elected to be Cleveland Heights' first directly elected mayor, and was sworn in on January 1, 2022.

The current city council is composed of Vice President Craig Cobb, President Melody Joy Hart, Davida Russell, Tony Cuda,  Janine Boyd, Anthony Mattox, Jr., and Gail Larson.

Cleveland Heights is reliably Democratic. Six of the seven current members of Council are Democrats. 

In the 2008 presidential election, Barack Obama defeated John McCain 84.2%-15.0% while winning the state, while in the 2004 presidential election, John Kerry defeated George W. Bush 80.8%-18.8% in the city but was unable to win the state. In 2012, every precinct in the city was carried by Barack Obama. 

Cleveland Heights is in Ohio's 11th congressional district, which is represented by Congresswoman Shontel Brown. Ohio's 11th congressional district was formerly represented by U.S. Secretary of Housing and Urban Development Marcia Fudge.

In 2003, Cleveland Heights voters approved a referendum to establish Ohio's first domestic partnership registry.

Education

Public education in the city of Cleveland Heights is provided by two school districts. Most of the city is served by the Cleveland Heights-University Heights City School District, while a small portion located on the northwest side of the city lies within the East Cleveland City School District.

Several private schools are located within the city, including Beaumont School, Lutheran High School East, Horizon Montessori, Ruffing Montessori, Hebrew Academy of Cleveland, Saint Ann School, Mosdos Ohr Hatorah, and Yeshiva of Cleveland.

Notable people

 Gina Abercrombie-Winstanley (1976), former U.S. Ambassador to Republic of Malta
 Hal Becker (1972), writer
 Jean Berko Gleason (1949), psycholinguist
 Hector Boiardi, businessman also known as Chef Boy-Ar-Dee.
 Timothy Broglio, Archbishop for the Military Services, USA.
 Martha Chase, geneticist who helped to confirm that DNA was the genetic material of life through the Hershey-Chase Experiment.
 Barry Cofield, NFL player, Super Bowl XLII champion
 Chuck Cooper, Tony Award-winning actor
 Kevin Edwards, former National Basketball Association player.
 Eric Fingerhut, President and CEO of Jewish Federations of North America, former CEO of Hillel International, former U.S. Congressman from northeast Ohio, former Ohio State Senator.
 Jimmy Fox (1965), James Gang founder drummer and organist
 Darrell Issa, U.S. Congressman representing the San Diego, CA area.
 Jason Kelce (2006), NFL player for Philadelphia Eagles, Super Bowl LII champion
 Travis Kelce (2008), NFL player for Kansas City Chiefs, Super Bowl LIV and LVII champion
 Steve LaTourette, former U.S. Congressman from northeast Ohio
 Clea Lewis (1983), actor
 Mike McGruder (1980), NFL player for New England Patriots, played in Super Bowl XXXI
 Mel Tucker (1990), Head coach Michigan State, Spartans football team.
 Merton F. Utter (1917–1980), microbiologist and biochemist, died in Westboro.
 Sean Young, Actress

See also

 Forest Hill, Ohio

References

External links

Surrounding communities

 
Cities in Ohio
Cities in Cuyahoga County, Ohio
Cleveland metropolitan area
Jewish communities in the United States
Nuclear-free zones in the United States
Populated places established in 1828
Russian-American culture in Ohio